John Williams Beal (May 9, 1855 - July 7, 1919) was an architect in Boston, Massachusetts.

Biography
He was born on 19 May 1855 in Scituate, Massachusetts, to John Beal and Lucy Ann Beal.

He married Mary Washburn.

He trained at Massachusetts Institute of Technology and then worked for McKim, Mead & White before opening his own business. His sons, John and Horatio Beal founded J. Williams Beal, Sons, which designed the Masonic Temple (Quincy, Massachusetts) in 1926, and other area buildings.

He died on 7 July 1919 in Hanover, Massachusetts.

Designed by Beal
 Charles Street African Methodist Episcopal Church / All Souls' Church, Roxbury, Boston (1888)
 Eliot Congregational Church, chapel addition, Roxbury, Boston (1889)
 Harriswood Crescent rowhouses, Harold St., Roxbury, Mass. (1890)
 Peabody-Williams House,  Newton, Mass. (1891)
 Church of the Unity, Randolph, Mass. (ca.1892)
 First Baptist Church, Lexington, Mass. (1892-1893)
 Congregational Church, North Middleboro, Mass. (ca.1895)
 78 Powell Street, residence (1895) and stable/Carriage House (1895), Cottage Farm Historic District, Brookline, Mass. for Grace and Edwin Kramer.
 11 Wayne Street, neo-Colonial style residence of Judge Albert F. Hayden in Roxbury, Mass. (circa 1899) 
 Quietude, Adirondack lodge for Boston accountant H.M. Brock, Tuftonboro, NH (1904)
 Baptist Church, Brockton, Mass. (1908-1909) 
 Charles A. Burdett house, Intervale, New Hampshire (ca. 1910) 
 Lucknow (Castle in the Clouds), Moultonborough, New Hampshire (1913-1914)
 Mayflower Inn on Manomet Point, Plymouth, Mass. (1917)
 First National Bank Building, Northampton, Mass. (1928)
 6 Briggs Street, Salem Mass. for Mrs. S. B. Simonds

References

1855 births
1919 deaths
Architects from Boston
19th century in Boston